Graham Douglas McColl (18 June 1934 – 16 March 2022) was an Australian rules footballer who played with Carlton in the Victorian Football League (VFL). His career ended abruptly during a night game against St Kilda with a ruptured ACL knee injury that could not be repaired. Originally from Coburg Football Club in the Victorian Football Association (VFA) he played 70 games and won a best & fairest for the club in 1956.

Notes

External links 
 
 Graham McColl's profile at Blueseum

1934 births
2022 deaths
Carlton Football Club players
Australian rules footballers from Victoria (Australia)
Coburg Football Club players